The Our Lady of the Angels Convent, commonly known as the Iglesia y Convento de los Descalzos, is a Franciscan convent in Rímac District, Lima, Peru. It was declared a Cultural heritage of Peru in 1972.

History
The local population nicknamed it the barefoot convent because of the sandals worn by the Franciscans.

It has a simple and austere architecture, without decorations, with long corridors and rooms at different levels due to the inclination of the hill where it sits. The characteristics of its construction resemble it to a rural hacienda house.

The Franciscan convent was an important evangelizing center from where the missionaries in charge of teaching Christian doctrine to the original peoples of the Peruvian highlands departed.

On December 18, 1981, the Museo de los Descalzos was opened in its facilities. The relics of Francisco Solano, Francisco de Asís and Antonio de Padua are exhibited, along with more than 300 canvases from the Cusco, Lima and Quito school, and a library with more than 15,000 goatskin books from the 16th to the 20th centuries.

References

Cultural heritage of Peru
Roman Catholic churches in Lima